Trigger Creek is a stream in the Taney County, Missouri. The stream headwaters are just east of Missouri Route JJ and it flows northeast passing under Route J between Kirbyville to the northwest and Mincy to the southeast. The stream enters Bull Shoals Lake about 1.5 miles northeast of Route J.

The source is located at:  and the confluence is at:   .

Trigger Creek was so named on account of frequent flash flooding (i.e. as fast as a "trigger").

See also
List of rivers of Missouri

References

Rivers of Taney County, Missouri
Rivers of Missouri